Angus Scott is an international broadcaster, journalist, university lecturer and academic. He has worked for Al Jazeera, beIN SPORTS, ITN, ITV Sport and Setanta Sports. He mainly covers football and rugby union, but has also hosted cricket  and motorsport coverage. In 2021 he completed a doctorate at the University of Winchester on Al Jazeera.

Early career 

Angus started his television career presenting local news and sport having previously worked in newspapers. He presented football shows for Granada in Manchester and Carlton. He then crossed the border to present HTV Wales rugby programmes. HTV is where Angus started his career in the 80s. He also frequently presented Carlton/LWT's London Tonight.

ITV Sport 

Between 2001 and 2003, Angus was the main host of ITV's The Goal Rush, the network's answer to Sky Sports' Soccer Saturday and BBC Sport's Final Score. The programme was axed at the end of 2003 when ITV lost its contract to screen the Premier League highlights. Angus occasionally presented the football show On The Ball for ITV as well as Champions League programmes. He presented the Trinidad and Tobago vs Paraguay World Cup 2006 game on ITV4. He has also presented The Championship. He also worked on the 2002 FIFA World Cup in Korea and Japan. Prior to leaving ITV, he regularly commentated for ITV's highlights show The Championship.

He was also involved in ITV's Rugby Union coverage and Angus was one of the presenters of ITV's 1999 and 2003 Rugby World Cup coverage alongside Jim Rosenthal and Gabby Logan. He has also presented highlights of England's home matches in the Six Nations, for which ITV had the rights to from 1997 to 2002. He has also fronted the Rugby World Cup Sevens, and the main IRB Sevens tournaments for ITV.

Angus also appeared for ITV covering motorsport. He was ITV's stand in presenter for their Formula 1 coverage. He presented the 2005 Belgian Grand Prix and the 2006 United States Grand Prix for ITV in the absence of main hosts Jim Rosenthal and Steve Rider. He also presented ITV's World Rally Championship coverage, in 2004 and 2005, as well as presenting Motorsport magazine programme Speed Sunday.
Angus presented the British Superbike Championship on ITV and ITV-owned channel Men & Motors in 2006, and he co-presented ITV's coverage British Touring Car Championship with Vicki Butler-Henderson. He was replaced in 2007 when he left ITV, by Louise Goodman and Ted Kravitz in the BTCC presenting duties, and James Cracknell and Jane Omorogbe in the Superbike duties.

Setanta
Angus was considered an ITV Sport all-rounder, having presented more or less every sport which ITV cover. However his ITV Sport opportunities were becoming increasingly limited in 2006, so he decided to leave the network to become the main presenter of Setanta Sports Football.
Angus was offered the job of main host of Setanta's live UK coverage of the Premier League. He led coverage of 46 live Premier League matches each season as well as FA Cup and England matches. However, the collapse of Setanta UK meant that his contract with the company was terminated.

Al Jazeera
He fronted Al Jazeera's English language sports channel beIN SPORTS in Doha, Qatar for 11 years. There he was the network's main anchor, continuing his all round presenting duties. He has fronted the channel's World Cup coverage for South Africa 2010, (which peaked with a World Cup final audience of 163 million viewers in the Middle East and North Africa), Brazil 2014 and Russia 2018. He also fronts beIN's Champions League coverage, Aviva Premiership Rugby and The Six Nations, Ashes cricket and Formula One. He is also the main anchor for La Liga, Ligue Un, Serie A and the Bundesliga. He also hosted beIN's coverage of the London Olympics.

Freelance
Since returning to the UK, Scott has worked freelance as well as running a media training business. He covers Premier League coverage for Amazon Prime Video, FA Cup for ESPN, and UEFA Champions League for BT Sport.

Personal life
Scott is the brother of ITV News Sport Editor and former ITV West Country presenter Steve Scott, and he also has a sister named Cathy.

Educated at Clifton College, he studied English and Drama at the University of Winchester, where he now lectures in journalism part-time.
Angus supports Bristol City. His final football commentary for ITV before joining Setanta was on a match between Bristol City and Nottingham Forest.

References

External links
 

1967 births
Alumni of the University of Winchester
Academics of the University of Winchester
ITV regional newsreaders and journalists
Television personalities from Bristol
Living people
People educated at Clifton College